"She'll Be Coming 'Round the Mountain" (sometimes referred to as "Coming 'Round the Mountain") is a traditional folk song often categorized as children's music. The song is derived from the Christian spiritual known as "When the Chariot Comes". It has been assigned the number 4204 in the Roud Folk Song Index.

Background
The first appearance of "She'll Be Comin' Round the Mountain" in print was in Carl Sandburg's The American Songbag in 1927. Sandburg reports that the Negro spiritual "When the Chariot Comes", which was sung to the same melody, was adapted by railroad workers in the Midwestern United States during the 1890s. It is often heard today with responses that add on to the previous verse.

The original song was published in Old Plantation Hymns in 1899. It ostensibly refers to the Second Coming of Christ and subsequent Rapture, with the she referring to the chariot that the returning Christ is depicted as driving. Like many spirituals that originated in the African-American community, this was probably a coded anthem for the Underground Railroad. It was also used in labor circles to refer to Mother Jones, who frequently visited far-flung communities with labor issues.

The secularized version that developed among railroad work gangs in the late 19th century has become a standard over the years, appearing in printed collections of children's music while also being performed by both children and adults in sing-alongs, particularly as a campfire song. Since the mid-1920s, "She'll Be Comin' Round the Mountain" has been recorded by numerous musicians, ranging from Tommy Tucker and Bing Crosby to Pete Seeger and Neil Young.

Variations
The earliest known recordings of the song were by Henry Whitter on Okeh Records (OKeh 40063) in 1924 and Vernon Dalhart & Co. on Edison Records (Edison 51608) in 1925.
In the Reader's Digest Children's Songbook, published in 1985, the song is adapted with new words by Dan Fox and his son, Paul. The lyrics tell of the things "she" will do in increasing number up to ten, for example, "She'll be ridin' on a camel", "She'll be tuggin' on two turtles", and "She'll be carvin' three thick thistles".
On the album Doing It In Lagos: Boogie, Pop & Disco in 1980s Nigeria, the song is referenced by Danny Offia & The Friks in their song "Funk With Me".
The digital entertainment studio JibJab created a satire about George W. Bush's re-election, called "Second Term" using the tune of "She'll Be Coming 'Round the Mountain".
Neil Young & Crazy Horse recorded "Jesus' Chariot", a version of "When the Chariot Comes", on their 2012 album Americana.
The German song "Von den blauen Bergen kommen wir" shares the same melody, as does the song "Tante aus Marokko" and its Dutch equivalent, "Tante uit Marokko". These last two songs use similar themes from the original but personify the main character more literally as a woman riding on a camel with pistols.
In Finland this song is known as "Kun mä kuolen" ("When I die") where the protagonist does his last will on his earthly possession as he humorously explains why he does not need those things in Heaven.
A similar song is found in Norway (derived from Lorentzen's Danish version): "Du skal få min gamle sykkel når jeg dør (hvis jeg dør)." The verses list all the "old" (gamle) things that "you" (du) can have "when/if I die" (når/hvis jeg dør). The "things" range from the lightly humorous to the scatological to the somewhat pornographic, with many also playing on religion.
Some sports fans at the University of Cambridge use this tune to sing "we would rather be at Oxford than St John's".
Funkadelic references the tune in their song "Comin' Round The Mountain".
"Ye Cannae Shove Yer Granny Aff A Bus" is a children's song to the same tune in Scotland. A variation of this version is heard in the closing scene of the Midsomer Murders episode "Harvest of Souls".
"There's a Skeeter on My Peter" is a dirty parody.
Daniel Radcliffe performed a version for the show Miracle Workers in Season 3 (2021).
 The melody is used in a World War II era Greek satirical song called "Youpi Yaya" or "Wife, whose are the children?" It refers to women who slept with German and Italian occupiers ("one kid says sì, another says ja), and after liberation are sleeping with English and Indian soldiers ("little Englishmen in short pants and behind them a regiment of Indians"). British and Commonwealth troops landed in Greece in 1944 after the Germans withdrew, and helped defeat the communist side in the first round (1944-5) of the Greek Civil War. 
 The melody has been used in some 2021 anti-vaccination mandate protests world-wide with the lyrics "You can stick your vaccine mandate up your ass".
 The melody was also used for the song "Shoot! Shoot!" sung by Filipino rapper and actor Andrew E.

Animation
In the 1938 short animated film Mickey's Trailer, Goofy sings the song as he drives a car and trailer up a hill.
In the 1941 short animated film Timber, Donald Duck sings the song during both the opening and the closing scenes.
The Peanuts cast performed the song in the 1977 film Race for Your Life, Charlie Brown. It was performed by The Winans in This Is America, Charlie Brown in its episode titled "Building of the Transcontinental Railroad".
Mrs. Frizzle and Carlos sing the song while the class is travelling through Arnold Matthew's intestines in The Magic School Bus episode "For Lunch" (1994). In the later episode "Rocks and Rolls", which focuses on water erosion, she sings "We'll make changes in the mountain as we roll".

See also
List of train songs

References

Further reading
Studwell, William  of the first half of the 20th century.'' Bloomington, Indiana: Many Musician Memories, 2001. Print.

American children's songs
Traditional children's songs
American folk songs
Burl Ives songs
Songs about trains
Songs about mountains